Roseville is a city in Macomb County in the U.S. state of Michigan, and is a part of the Metro Detroit area.  The population was 47,299 at the 2010 census. Until 1958, Roseville was a part of Erin Township.

History 

The first permanent post office in the area was established in 1840 by William Rose who named it the Roseville Post Office in honor of his father Dennison Rose, a veteran of the War of 1812.

The Village of Roseville was incorporated in 1926 and the Municipal Building was constructed in 1929 at Gratiot Avenue and Meier Road.  This replaced the Erin Township Building that was built near the corner of 11 Mile Road and Gratiot in 1886.  The 1929 building housed administrative offices as well as the police and fire departments until the 1960s when separate police and fire stations were constructed.  City offices remained in the building until 1974.

Michigan's first commercial airport, Packard Field, opened at Gratiot Avenue and Frazho Road in 1919.  It was renamed Gratiot Airport in 1929 and later Hartung Field.  The Eastgate Shopping Center was constructed on the site in the 1950s.

The Erin-Roseville Library was established in 1936 in one room of the Municipal Building.  The library moved to its own building in the 1960s and into the newly constructed civic center in 1974.  It currently circulates approximately 250,000 items annually.

In 1958, the village and remaining parts of Erin Township were incorporated as the City of Roseville.

An early regional mall, the Macomb Mall, opened in 1964 and is still open today, located west of Gratiot and Masonic.

Geography

Main highways
 runs north–south, still traveling east and west, along the eastern edge of the city.  Between 10 and 12 Mile Roads, it forms the boundary between Roseville and St. Clair Shores.
 travels east and west through the middle of Roseville.
, which is Gratiot Avenue (named after engineer Charles Gratiot) runs northeast and southwest, and (roughly) bisects the city as it wends from Detroit to Mount Clemens and points north.
, named for Governor Alex Groesbeck, is near the western edge of Roseville.  It extends northeast from Detroit, and is a high-speed and broad diagonal connector to northern Macomb County.

Unnumbered roads
East–west travel is mainly on the mile roads, that is 10 Mile Road on the south (Eastpointe, formerly known as East Detroit) border through 14 Mile Road on the north border.  See Mile Road System (Detroit).
Utica Road is an important diagonal connector that criss-crosses the city from southeast to northwest, starting at Martin Road, near Gratiot Avenue, and extending to the city's northern boundary at 13 Mile, then to Fraser, Clinton Township, Sterling Heights and Utica beyond.

Neighboring communities

Government 
Roseville has a Council-Manager government.  Voters elect the six council member, mayor, city clerk and treasurer for four-year.  The terms are staggered so that only three council members are selected in odd-year general elections.

Roseville is located within the 39th Judicial District with the City of Fraser.

Demographics

2010 census
As of the census of 2010, there were 47,299 people, 19,553 households, and 12,055 families living in the city. The racial makeup of the city was 83.1% White, 11.8% African American, 0.4% Native American, 1.6% Asian, 0.4% from other races, and 2.6% from two or more races. Hispanic or Latino of any race were 2.0% of the population.

There were 19,553 households, of which 30.9% had children under the age of 18 living with them, 38.3% were married couples living together, 17.4% had a female householder with no husband present, 6.0% had a male householder with no wife present, and 38.3% were non-families. 31.7% of all households were made up of individuals, and 11.6% had someone living alone who was 65 years of age or older. The average household size was 2.41 and the average family size was 3.03.

The median age in the city was 37.9 years. 23% of residents were under the age of 18; 8.9% were between the ages of 18 and 24; 28.3% were from 25 to 44; 26.7% were from 45 to 64; and 13.1% were 65 years of age or older. The gender makeup of the city was 48.4% male and 51.6% female.

2000 census
As of the census of 2000, there were 48,129 people, 19,976 households, and 12,724 families living in the city. The racial makeup of the city was 93.43% White, 2.60% African American, 0.42% Native American, 1.63% Asian, 0.03% Pacific Islander, 0.32% from other races, and 1.57% from two or more races. Hispanic or Latino of any race were 1.50% of the population.

Of the 19,976 households, 28.6% had children under the age of 18 living with them, 46.4% were married couples living together, 12.7% had a female householder with no husband present, and 36.3% were non-families. 30.8% of all households were made up of individuals, and 12.6% had someone living alone who was 65 years of age or older.  The average household size was 2.40 and the average family size was 3.02.

In the city, the population was widely diverse, with 23.1% under the age of 18, 8.2% from 18 to 24, 33.0% from 25 to 44, 20.2% from 45 to 64, and 15.4% who were 65 years of age or older.  The median age was 36 years. For every 100 females, there were 93.8 males.  For every 100 females age 18 and over, there were 90.1 males.

The median income for a household in the city was $41,220, and the median income for a family was $49,244. Males had a median income of $40,113 versus $26,281 for females. The per capita income for the city was $19,823.  About 6.1% of families and 7.9% of the population were below the poverty line, including 9.9% of those under age 18 and 5.8% of those age 65 or over.

Education 
Public schools are operated by Roseville Community Schools and Fraser Public Schools.  Roseville Community Schools operates seven elementary schools, two middle schools and one high school.  Fraser Public Schools operates two elementary schools in the city.

The charter school Conner Creek Academy East is in the city.

St. Angela School of the Roman Catholic Archdiocese of Detroit operated from approximately 1954 until the 2010s.

Notable people
 Joe Block (born 1978), baseball broadcaster for Pittsburgh Pirates
 Crystal Reed (born 1985), actress
 Walter C. Wetzel (1919–1945), 1946 Medal of Honor recipient (posthumously, for actions on 3 April 1945)

References

External links

City of Roseville Official website
Roseville Public Library

Cities in Macomb County, Michigan
Metro Detroit
Populated places established in 1840
1840 establishments in Michigan